Fly Tyer is an American magazine dedicated to the subject of fly tying, the art of tying materials to a hook for the purposes of fly fishing. Published four times a year, Fly Tyer is currently the largest fly-tying magazine in terms of circulation. It employs "perfect binding" instead of stapled pages, and usually features a close-up image of a fly on its cover.

History
Fly Tyer was started in 1978. It was relaunched as a quarterly magazine by Abenaki Publishers in 1995, when it became clear that the market would support a fly-tying specific publication. Its success has proven the desire for fly tying content. Fly Tyer was also the original name of the publication that became American Angler.

Fly Tyer is an asset of Morris Communications, which also owns publications such as Gray's Sporting Journal, American Angler, and Saltwater Fly Fishing. The magazine is edited by David Klausmeyer, author of Unnaturals: A Practical Guide to Tying with Synthetics, Trout Streams of Northern New England and Tying Classic Freshwater Streamers: An Illustrated Step-by-Step Guide, among other works.

References

 

Sports magazines published in the United States
Quarterly magazines published in the United States
Fly fishing literature
Hunting and fishing magazines
Magazines established in 1978
Magazines published in Georgia (U.S. state)
Mass media in Augusta, Georgia
Recreational fishing